Peter L. Cashman (born May 22, 1936), is an American politician who was the 100th Lieutenant Governor of Connecticut from 1973 to 1975.

Biography 
Cashman was born in Cleveland, Ohio He graduated from Yale University in 1959 with a BA in American Studies.

Cashman lived in Lyme, New London County, Connecticut. He was an alternate delegate to Republican National Convention from Connecticut, 1972. From 1970 to 1976 he served as a member of the Connecticut Senate and was President Pro Tempore. and Lt. Governor. Succeeded to the office of Lieutenant Governor by virtue of being President Pro Tempore of the Senate. Took oath of office on June 7, 1973.
 
In 2012, Cashman worked in Fairfield as the managing director of Building Energy Performance Assessment News, a newsletter on energy consumption.

Cashman is an active investor in commercial real estate and a director of Connecticut Innovations, Inc. He was member of the Connecticut Clean Energy Fund advisory board, a quasi public corporation owned by the State of Connecticut that both promotes energy conservation and invests in new energy technologies. He is past chairman of both Environmental Data Resources, Inc. and The Sanborn Map Company.

References

External links

State of Connecticut 

Lieutenant Governors of Connecticut
Living people
1936 births
Presidents pro tempore of the Connecticut Senate
Yale College alumni